Nogometni klub Grobničan or simply NK Grobničan is a Croatian football club based in the town of Čavle which competes in the Croatian Second League, the third tier of the Croatian football pyramid.

Honours 

Treća HNL – West:
Winners (1): 2012–13

Četvrta HNL – West:
Winners (1): 2007–08

Četvrta HNL – Rijeka:
Winners (2): 2017–18, 2018–19

Current squad

References

External links
Official website 

Football clubs in Croatia
Football clubs in Primorje-Gorski Kotar County
Association football clubs established in 1932
1932 establishments in Croatia